Tiff Jimber is an American singer-songwriter who has placed songs in movies and television, such as Love Happens, The Blind Side, and Dolphin Tale. She became a contestant and finalist on VH1's Rock 'n Roll Fantasy Camp Season 2.

Early life 

Tiff, was born in Denver, Colorado as "Tiffany Anne Gyomber" and raised in San Diego.  She began piano lessons at age 6 and was writing songs since she could speak.  At the age of 16, she began performing at local open mics.
 
After high school, she was accepted to Berklee College of Music in Boston, MA, earning dual degrees in Music Production and Engineering and Songwriting.  Immediately after graduation, she moved to Los Angeles, and was employed at Conway Recording Studios in Hollywood and eventually began running sound at the Whisky a Go Go. She slowly moved away from music engineering projects and started focusing on live performance, including a short stint with the punk pop band Jerra, and then eventually opting to perform solo, playing keyboard and accordion.

Career 

Jimber's debut album Obstacles was recorded in the fall of 2004, and was self-produced and recorded in Santa Monica, California. Obstacles was nominated for AAA album of the year by The Los Angeles Music Awards. After two years of touring, she released her first LP Perfectly in 2006. In 2004, composer Christopher Young used her vocals in the soundtrack for his score of the movie The Grudge. In 2009, Jimber released Burning at Both Ends, her second full-length record with producer Matt Bobb.

In November 2009, her song "Love That You Need", co-written with Matt Bobb, was placed in the iTunes movie trailer for the film The Blind Side. Christopher Young used her vocals again in his score of the film Love Happens.

Additionally, her song "City Life" received honorable mention from Billboard Magazine songwriting contest and placed in the Australian Songwriting Contest. "Burning at Both Ends" was featured in US Weekly. Tiff embarked on her first European tour in 2011, performing in various countries. Jimber is the recipient of the ASCAP Plus Award from 2007 to 2013.

She was a finalist in VH1's Rock 'n Roll Fantasy Camp Season 2, in the band "The Bad Kick".  Not only was Jimber starring as the only keyboardist in the competition, she was personally chosen by Matt Sorum to be a member of the band "The Bad Kick".  During Season 2, Jimber was coached by Sorum and "The Bad Kick" won the final battle during the season finale of the competition, hosted at the House of Blues in Hollywood.

In September 2011, "Reawakening", which was co-written with Matt Bobb at Matchstick Music, was placed in the Dolphin Tale exclusive featurette, "Winter." 
Jimber co-wrote the song "Staying Up All Night" for Disney star G. Hannelius and "Toyland" which was featured as the opening number in the Disney Parks Christmas Day Parade.

Songs

Tiff Jimber

Discography

Tiff Jimber

References 

 Swerve Magazine, http://www.theswervemagazine.com/Tiff_Jimbers.html

External links 
   Official Website

American singer-songwriters
Living people
Year of birth missing (living people)